Italy at the European Athletics Team Championships participated at all editions of the European Athletics Team Championships from Leiria 2009.

Final standings
Italy national athletics team participated in the Super League in all editions.

Results

Overall

Men

Women

Top three finishes

Men

Women

Silesia 2021

Italy competes in the 2021 European Athletics Team Championships in 39 out of 40 races and so signs 0 points in the high jump due to the absence of the last moment of Gianmarco Tamberi, high jumper who had the best measure among those entered in the race, therefore the damage made to the classification is quantifiable in 7 points. The Italian team won eight events in this edition.

Men

Women

See also
 Italy national athletics team
 Italy at the European Cup

References

External links
 European Athletic Association

Athletics in Italy
Nations at the European Athletics Team Championships
Italy national athletics team